Mangala Municipality (Nepali :मंगला  गाँउपालिका) is a Gaunpalika in Myagdi District in Gandaki Province of Nepal. On 12 March 2017, the government of Nepal implemented a new local administrative structure, with the implementation of the new local administrative structure, VDCs have been replaced with municipal and Village Councils. Mangala is one of these 753 local units.

References 

Myagdi District
Gandaki Province
Rural municipalities of Nepal established in 2017
Rural municipalities in Myagdi District